Else Heart.Break() is a programming puzzle video game. It was developed by Erik Svedäng with art by Niklas Åkerblad.

Development
Else Heart.Break() was developed by Swedish developer Erik Svedäng. Development began in 2010 after the release of Blueberry Garden. It was released on Windows, Linux, and Mac OS X on September 24, 2015.

Reception

Else Heart.Break() received generally positive reviews from video game critics.

References

External links

2015 video games
Linux games
MacOS games
Programming games
Video games developed in Sweden
Windows games
Single-player video games